DOJ may mean:

 Justice minister, also referred to as a Department of Justice
 Double Open Jaw, a kind of open-jaw ticket, used for calculating airfares
 United States Department of Justice
 Department of Justice (Philippines)
 Department of Justice (Canada)

See also
Dojo (disambiguation)